Reynir Sandgerði, sometimes known as Reynir S., is an Icelandic sports club based in Sandgerði on the Reykjanes peninsular. The club has active departments in football, basketball and swimming.

Basketball
Reynir Sandgerði's basketball department was founded in 1980. It played in the top-tier Úrvalsdeild karla during the 1989–1990 season. In 2021, the team won 2. deild karla and was promoted to 1. deild karla. Prior to the start of the 2021–2022 season, the team withdrew from competition.

Honours
1. deild karla (1):
1989
2. deild karla (2):
1984, 2001, 2021

Notable players

Coaches

Football

In 2018, Reynir's men's football team finished first the 4. deild karla, defeating Kórdrengir 7–1 in the playoffs final.

Honours
4. deild karla (1):
2018

Current squad

References

External links
 Reynir profile at Icelandic Basketball Federation
 Reynir profile at Football Association of Iceland
 

Basketball teams in Iceland
Football clubs in Iceland